Klangfarbenmelodie (German for "sound-color melody") is a musical technique that involves splitting a musical line or melody between several instruments, rather than assigning it to just one instrument (or set of instruments), thereby adding color (timbre) and texture to the melodic line. The technique is sometimes compared to "pointillism", a neo-impressionist painting technique.

History
The term derives from Arnold Schoenberg's Harmonielehre, where he discusses the creation of "timbre structures". Schoenberg and Anton Webern are particularly noted for their use of the technique, Schoenberg most notably in the third of his Five Pieces for Orchestra (Op. 16), and Webern in his Op. 10 (likely a response to Schoenberg's Op. 16), his Concerto for Nine Instruments (Op. 24), the Op. 11 pieces for cello and piano, and his orchestration of the six-part ricercar from Bach's Musical Offering:

This may be compared with Bach's open score of the subject and the traditional homogeneous timbre used in arrangements:

Schoenberg himself employed the technique in his 1928 orchestration of the "St. Anne" organ Prelude BWV 552 from J. S. Bach's Clavier-Übung III. Malcolm MacDonald says of this arrangement, "The gamut of colour—including harp, celesta and glockenspiel, six clarinets of various sizes, and a very agile bass tuba is brilliantly kaleidoscopic. The instrumentation has a serious purpose, however: it emphasizes structural divisions ... and, above all, brings out the individual contrapuntal lines." A sequence of constantly changing timbres may be clearly heard in Schoenberg's rendering of the following passage:

Notable examples of such voice distribution that preceded the use of the term may be found in music of the 18th and 19th centuries. John Eliot Gardiner says of the orchestral opening of J. S. Bach's Cantata Brich dem Hungrigen dein Brot, BWV 39, "Bach sets out almost tentatively in an introductory sinfonia with repeated quavers tossed from paired recorders to paired oboes to the strings and back over stiffly disjointed quavers in the continuo.":

In Beethoven's Symphony No. 3, ("Eroica"), first movement, according to George Grove, we hear "a succession of phrases of three notes, repeated by different instruments one after another":

Similarly, in the fourth movement of Berlioz' Symphonie fantastique, ("March to the Scaffold"), the melody first appears as a descending scale played on 'cellos and basses:

Later, this melodic line is passed between the strings and the winds several times:

There are further instances in the works of Claude Debussy: 

Regarding the latter, Samson writes: "To a marked degree the music of Debussy elevates timbre to an unprecedented structural status; already in Prélude à l'après-midi d'un faune the color of flute and harp functions referentially."

In the 1950s, the concept inspired a number of European composers including Karlheinz Stockhausen to attempt systematization of timbre along serial lines, especially in electronic music.

During the late 20th century, musicians within the progressive rock genre experimented with using this compositional technique, a notable example being Gentle Giant.

See also
 Hocket
 Klang (music)
 Melodic fission

References

Sources
  Reprinted, New York: Dover Publications, 1962.
  .
 
 
 
 
 
 
  [First edition, Leipzig and Vienna: Verlagseigentum der Universal-Edition, 1911.]

External links 
 A streaming MP3 recording of Webern's orchestration of the Ricercar a 6 from Bach's Musical Offering.
  Klangfarben Orchestra

Musical techniques
Post-tonal music theory
Timbre